Guangci–Fengtian Temple is an under construction metro station on the Red Line located in Xinyi, Taipei, Taiwan. Construction of the station is scheduled to be complete on 8 October 2023, and the station is scheduled to open at the end of 2023. This will also be the last heavy-capacity metro station of Taipei Metro.

Station overview
The station will be a three-level, underground station with an island platform, serving as the terminus of the Xinyi Eastern Extension. "Rising Water" will be the core basis for the architectural design concept of the station.

Station layout

Around the station
Fengtian Temple
Guangci Charity Park

References

Tamsui–Xinyi line stations
Railway stations scheduled to open in 2023